Lachlan MacLachlan (9 May 1791 – 30 April 1849) was Scottish-born barrister and, briefly, a Repeal Association MP.
 
MacLachlan, the son of Robert MacLachlan and Mary Campbell, was born in Strathlachlan.
 
MacLachlan became Repeal Association Member of Parliament (MP) for Galway Borough in 1832 but was unseated on petition on 30 April 1833.
 
He was awarded the compensation for the enslaved people on Pembroke estate in Tobago, as he was, alongside Andrew Henry Lynch and James Campbell, an assignee of a mortgage, probably as executors and beneficiaries of the will of his uncle Lt General James Campbell (1743–1820).

MacLachlan died in Galway in 1849.

References

External links
 
 

1791 births
1849 deaths
Irish Repeal Association MPs
Members of the Parliament of the United Kingdom for County Galway constituencies (1801–1922)
People from Argyll and Bute
Strachur
UK MPs 1832–1835